General David Padilla Arancibia had taken the Presidency 24 November 1978, and formed his cabinet.

mil – military

ind – independent

Notes

Cabinets of Bolivia
Cabinets established in 1978
Cabinets disestablished in 1979
1978 establishments in Bolivia
1979 disestablishments in Bolivia